The Frankfort Convention Center was a 5,000-seat multi-purpose arena in Frankfort, Kentucky, USA. It hosted locals sporting events and concerts.  It was opened as part of the Capital Plaza urban renewal project in the 1970s.  The arena's original name was the Farnham Dudgeon Civic Center.  
In January 2018, demolition on the facility started. Demolition was completed in Spring 2018. No replacement for the convention center were planned, and on 2022 there are still no plans to build a replacement.

References

Buildings and structures in Frankfort, Kentucky
Defunct sports venues in Kentucky
Indoor arenas in Kentucky
Convention centers in Kentucky
Sports venues completed in 1971
Sports venues demolished in 2018
1971 establishments in Kentucky
2017 disestablishments in Kentucky